Gerard Jan Joling (born 29 April 1960) is a Dutch singer and television presenter. Known for his high tenor voice, he rose to fame in the late 1980s and released a string of singles including "Ticket to the Tropics" and "Love Is in Your Eyes". He also achieved success in Asia and received more than 20 gold and platinum records.

In 1988, he was the Dutch participant in the Eurovision Song Contest 1988, with the song "Shangri-La".

His biggest hit was "No More Boleros" that reached the top 10 in several countries in mainland Europe. The song was recorded by different artists such as Clemente (Portugal), Sula Mazurenga and As Marcianas (both in Brazil), Karel Gott (in German and Czech), Demis Roussos, Semino Rossi, Oliver Thomas and George Meiring (in 2011 in South Africa).

Joling & Gordon Over de Vloer is a television program Gerard Joling made with singer Gordon in 2005. There were 3 seasons of the series which featured the duo during work and having a laugh.

In 2007, he was the host of Sterren dansen op het ijs and So You Wanna Be a Popstar for the television channel SBS 6. 2007 was also the year that sparked Joling's renewed success, with two number 1 songs, a number 1 album, and 11 gold and platinum awards.

In 2008, Joling became team captain on the Dutch TV show Wie ben ik? ("Who am I?"), in which the team captains, together with both two guests, have to guess who they are, based on hints and questions they can ask. The other team captain was Patty Brard.

Joling was scheduled to represent The Netherlands at the Eurovision Song Contest 2009 in Moscow as a member of De Toppers, but temporarily left the group after a conflict with Gordon. Joling was replaced in The Toppers with Jeroen van der Boom. In December 2009, De Toppers manager Benno de Leeuw announced in Dutch newspaper De Telegraaf that Gerard Joling and Gordon were to rejoin the group, turning the trio into a foursome once more.

Joling can also regularly be seen as a member of juries on a myriad of Dutch television programs. In 2018 he was seen in The Voice Senior and since 2019 in the Dutch version of the program The Masked Singer.

Discography

Albums

Solo

Solo: Compilation

Collaboration

Collaboration: Compilation

Singles

Featuring

Gallery

References

External links

Gerard Joling (official website)

1960 births
Living people
Dutch pop singers
Eurovision Song Contest entrants for the Netherlands
Eurovision Song Contest entrants of 1988
People from Alkmaar
Dutch LGBT singers
Dutch tenors
Dutch gay musicians
Gay singers
De Toppers members
20th-century Dutch LGBT people
21st-century Dutch LGBT people
Spanish-language singers of the Netherlands
20th-century Dutch male singers
21st-century Dutch male singers